Protein MAL2 is a protein that in humans is encoded by the MAL2 gene.

This gene encodes a multispan transmembrane protein belonging to the MAL proteolipid family. The protein is a component of lipid rafts and, in polarized cells, it primarily localizes to endosomal structures beneath the apical membrane. It is required for transcytosis, an intracellular transport pathway used to deliver membrane-bound proteins and exogenous cargos from the basolateral to the apical surface.

Interactions
MAL2 (gene) has been shown to interact with TPD52.

References

Further reading